Luis Fernandez-Gil is a Spanish actor and professional wrestling personality. In the 2000s and 2010s, Fernandez-Gil appeared in films including The Boys & Girls Guide to Getting Down and Jack and Jill, as well as television shows including The Mentalist and Punk'd. He is also known for portraying the non-wrestler characters Dario Cueto and his father Antonio Cueto on the professional wrestling television series Lucha Underground. Fernandez-Gil is currently signed to the Major League Wrestling promotion, where he performs under the ring name Cesar Duran.

Acting career
During the 2000s and 2010s, the films Fernandez-Gil has acted in included Asian Stories (Book 3), The Boys & Girls Guide to Getting Down and Jack and Jill; the television shows Fernandez-Gil has acted in include The Mentalist, Mike & Molly, Punk'd and Ray Donovan.

Professional wrestling career

Lucha Underground (2014–2018)
Fernandez-Gil portrayed the character of Dario Cueto in the professional wrestling television series Lucha Underground, as the on screen authority that is the owner and promoter of Lucha Underground. El Rey Network, which airs Lucha Underground, described the character as Lucha Underground's "proprietor" with characteristic "bloodlust" and "seemingly endless amounts of money". It also added that Cueto's "crowning achievement" is his Temple in Boyle Heights, in reference to the warehouse where both seasons of the television series have been  filmed.

The first taping of Lucha Underground occurred on 6 September 2014, with Cueto debuting in the series' first episode on 29 October 2014. Cueto had made an earlier appearance with a speech at Triplemanía XXII in 2014 where he invited the luchadores of AAA to participate in his Temple.

On 17 December 2014 episode, Cueto introduced the Lucha Underground Championship, declaring that the winner of his created Aztec Warfare match would be the new champion. On the 1 April 2015 episode, Cueto introduced the Lucha Underground Trios Championship and started a tournament to crown the inaugural champions.

On the 27 May 2015 episode, Cueto ordered that for their failings, one of the Crew would be sacrificed to Cueto's brother. Cortez Castro and Mr. Cisco turned on Bael, assisting in the implied killing by Cueto's brother. On the next episode, Cueto imprisoned Black Lotus for trying to kill his brother. Lotus was captured by Chavo Guerrero and the Crew, as Guerrero betrayed Lotus to Cueto in exchange for protection from Mexican enemies.

At part one of Lucha Undergrounds Ultima Lucha, Cueto admitted to Black Lotus that his brother is "the Monster" Matanza, forced by their father to partake in underground fighting. He claimed that it was El Dragon Azteca who had killed Lotus' parents while framing Matanza for the deed. Despite Azteca trying to save Lotus, Lotus attacked and seemingly killed Azteca on part two of Ultima Lucha on 5 August 2015, also the first season finale. Cueto then freed Lotus, claiming that Azteca's death had endangered them and they needed to leave, so Cueto and Lotus fled along with Matanza, while the show closed with the Temple being abandoned.

In the second season he's revealed to be hiding in an old warehouse along with Black Lotus and Matanza, luring people in order to feed Matanza.  Dario returns at the 2nd Aztec Warfare with Matanza, declaring him the final person in the match.  From there he resumes his duty of Lucha Underground owner and manager of Matanza. At the end of Ultima Lucha 3 Dario is seemingly shot to death, but not before using his final moments to make a call to his father.

In season 4, Fernandez-Gil played Antonio Cueto, the father of Dario Cueto, again as the on-screen authority.

Major League Wrestling (2021–present)
On the 5 May 2021 episode of Fusion, Fernandez-Gil debuted for Major League Wrestling (MLW) as the leader of the Azteca Underground stable under the ring name Cesar Duran.

As leader of Azteca Underground, Duran headed MLW Azteca, a miniseries where he made feuds and matches to his pleasure. Duran was later declared the matchmaker of MLW.

Personal life 
Fernandez-Gil holds a black belt in judo.

Filmography 

Sources

Awards 
Wrestling Observer Newsletter
Best Non-Wrestler (2015, 2016)

References

External links 
 
 
 

Living people
21st-century professional wrestlers
Spanish male film actors
Spanish male television actors
Spanish male professional wrestlers
Spanish expatriate sportspeople in the United States
Lucha Underground
Year of birth missing (living people)
Professional wrestling authority figures